The 2010 Capitala World Tennis Championship was a non-ATP affiliated exhibition tournament. Four of the world's top ten were competing in the knockout event, which had prize money of $250,000 to the winner. The event was held at the Abu Dhabi International Tennis Complex at the Zayed Sports City in Abu Dhabi, UAE. It served as a warm-up event for the season, with the ATP World Tour beginning on January 4, 2010.

Players
 Roger Federer ATP No.1
 Rafael Nadal ATP No.2
 Nikolay Davydenko ATP No.6
 Robin Söderling ATP No.8
 David Ferrer ATP No.17
 Stanislas Wawrinka ATP No.21

Results

 It was Nadal's first win at the event after finishing runner-up to Andy Murray in the previous edition. It drew him with Murray as the most successful players at the event with one title each.

External links
Official website

Capitala World Tennis Championship
Capitala World Tennis Championship
World Tennis Championship